Devosia submarina is a Gram-negative, aerobic, motile bacterium in the genus Devosia which was isolated from the Sea of Japan.

References

External links
Type strain of Devosia submarina at BacDive -  the Bacterial Diversity Metadatabase

Gram-negative bacteria
Hyphomicrobiales
Bacteria described in 2013